18-Methyltestosterone (18-MT) is an androgen/anabolic steroid (AAS) which was never marketed. Along with 19-nortestosterone (nandrolone) and 17α-ethynyltestosterone (ethisterone), it is a parent structure of a number of progestogens and AAS. These include the progestogens levonorgestrel (17α-ethynyl-18-methyl-19-nortestosterone) and its derivatives (e.g., desogestrel, gestodene, norgestimate, gestrinone) as well as AAS such as norboletone (17α-ethyl-18-methyl-19-nortestosterone) and tetrahydrogestrinone (THG; δ9,11-17α-ethyl-18-methyl-19-nortestosterone).

See also
 List of androgens/anabolic steroids

References

Abandoned drugs
Androgens and anabolic steroids
Androstanes
Enones
Tertiary alcohols